The Subaru XT was a four-passenger, 2-door coupé manufactured and marketed by Subaru for model years 1985-1991, with a facelift in 1987.  Assembly took place at Subaru's Yajima Plant in Ota, Japan and during its single generation, production reached just over 98,000.

The XT was noted for its pronounced wedge shape, its uncommonly low coefficient of drag; its aviation influences from the aircraft division of parent company Fuji Heavy Industry; and its host of features, either innovative or uncommon in the XT's class — including adjustable pneumatic suspension, digital dash, central locking system, op-art upholstery, pod- and center console-mounted HVAC controls, advanced trip computer, and instrument cluster that tilted with adjustment of the steering column.

The XT launched in February 1985 in the American market, followed by a June debut in Japan. It was marketed as the Alcyone in Japan, the Vortex in Australia and New Zealand — and as the XT (with the EA-82 four-cylinder engine) or XT6 (with the ER-27 six-cylinder engine) in North America and Europe.  All models were available in front-wheel drive or four-wheel drive, depending on the model year, and the range was superseded by the Subaru Alcyone SVX in 1992. 

The Alcyone nameplate derives from Alcyone, the brightest star in the Pleiades star cluster, stylized in the Subaru logo.

Design

The XT, introduced in February 1985 in the United States (June 1985 in Japan), was a wedged-shaped departure from the 1970s-influenced curves of Subaru'se previous models. The XT Turbo 4WD made its European debut at the March 1985 Geneva Motor Show. When introduced, the New York Times called it "the ultimate in jazzy design", in contrast to Subaru's other offerings. The XT was the first divered from earlier Subaru's in that it was less overtly practical or commodious. The 2.7-litre flat-six engine exceeded 2000 cc in the Japanese Domestic Market, thereby exceeding government engine displacement regulations, and incurring higher annual road tax.

Aerodynamics
Subaru's trademark boxer engine with its flat, horizontally-opposed cylinder configuration, enabled the bodywork's pronounced wedge shape, and extensive wind tunnel testing further lowered the XT's coefficient of drag. Pop-up headlights contributed to the wedge shape, and rectractable button-like flaps allowed opening the door while keeping the handles flush with their adjacent bodywork. The XT used a single 22 inch windshield wiper which tucked under the hood when not in use, and rubber spoilers ahead of each wheel opening settled the airflow past the tires and wheels, while doubling as "mud guards." The result was one of the most aerodynamic production cars of its time with a coefficient of drag of 0.29, improved fuel economy, and a quieter ride due to reduced wind noise.

Aviation inspiration
The XT's interior used numerous aviation-like features, reflecting influences from the aircraft division of Subaru's parent company, Fuji Heavy Industries. The cockpit featured pod-mounted controls for lighting, HVAC and wipers. The instrument panel moved with the standard tilt-telescope steering to keep the instruments oriented to the driver, recalling the same feature on the Isuzu Piazza and the Ford Probe introduced earlier in the 1980s and the Porsche 928 in the late 1970s. The joystick-shaped shifter integrated a thumb trigger interlock for the "on-demand" four-wheel drive. Turbo models featured a quasi-artificial horizon orange backlit liquid crystal instrument display with the tachometer, boost indicator, temperature and fuel gauges seen as three-dimensional graphs oriented to the quasi-horizon. 

The XT featured a turbocharger, computer-controlled engine and transmission, adjustable height suspension and an optional digital instrument cluster. The pneumatic with height control recalled the use of Hydropneumatic suspension by Citroën, and Mercedes-Benz. Other uncommon features included an electronic in-dash trip computer, headlight washers (XT6 only), alloy wheels featuring an inset rectangular shape, pass-through folding rear seats, racing style front seats and available push-button four-wheel drive (later changed to all-wheel drive).

1985-1987 (Pre-facelift & XT) 
The XT was launched initially as the XT in North America, Alcyone in Japan and Vortex in Australia and New Zealand. The pre-facelift XT was only powered by an H4 and was produced from 1985 to 1987.

Drivetrain 
The 1985 XT was fitted with one of two engines:
 EA82: 1781 cc H4 producing 97 hp (72 kW) at 5200 rpm and 103 ft·lbf (140 Nm) at 3200 rpm (9.5:1 compression ratio).
 EA82T: 1781 cc turbocharged H4 producing 112 hp (83 kW) at 4800 rpm and 143 ft·lbf (194 Nm) at 2800 rpm (7.5:1 compression ratio; some sources say 7.7:1.) in North American specifications.

These engines shared the following equipment and specifications:
  displacement (92×67mm/3.62×2.63")
 Multi-port fuel injection
 Single overhead camshafts

The XT was available with both manual and automatic transmissions.  85-87 XT Turbos were available as either front-wheel drive or part-time four-wheel drive, while the 85-87 XT non turbo cars were only available as front-wheel-drive. The part-time four-wheel-drive system was selectable by a push button atop the shifter.

Markets 
Like other Subaru models of the same vintage, the North American market XT was sold in three models: the base-model DL, the better-equipped GL, and the top-of-the-range GL-10. Many of the options mentioned above were available only on the GL-10. European markets generally only received the XT Turbo 4WD (XT Turbo Allrad in Germany), where the car was sold in small numbers as a halo model.

Two H4-powered derivatives were sold in Japan: the turbocharged Alcyone VR, and the non-turbocharged Alcyone VS.

Australia and New Zealand also got 2 models, the turbocharged Vortex Turbo and the non-turbocharged Vortex XT

Motorsports 
The XT was almost never officially used for racing, however one exception is the 1985 Wynn's Safari Australia where one XT competed, however it received damage and was not able to finish.

1987-1991 (Facelift & XT6) 

The XT received a minor update in 1987 for the second half of the 1987 model year, roughly corresponding to the 1988 launch of the XT6. Where earlier models featured bumper-mounted reverse lights, 1987-up models had the reverse lights in the center taillight panel, revised front and rear bumper fascias. In Japan, the original bumpers were used for the Alcyone VS and Alcyone VR while the Alcyone VX received the new facelift. In the US, all new models received the facelifted bumpers.

All wheel drive turbo and six-cylinder models were distinguished by their headrests; base models had solid headrests, where the turbo AWD and six-cylinder models had a large rectangular hole through the center.

Drivetrain 

The 1987 XT was fitted with only the EA82: 1781 cc H4 producing 97 hp (72 kW) at 5200 rpm and 103 ft·lbf (140 Nm) at 3200 rpm (9.5:1 compression ratio), as the turbo version was removed.

The XT6 was also fitted with stiffer suspension to compensate for the new heavier H6 engine.

In the Japan, the part-time 4WD system was replaced entirely by the new full-time 4WD system however in the US, the part-time system was still used as an option on the XT GL.

Features and Options 

The XT6 was fitted with a unique Cybrid adaptive electrohydraulic steering system that changed the level of assistance based on the vehicle's speed.  This system did not use a conventional belt-driven power steering pump, freeing up much-needed space in the XT6's already cramped engine bay. The Cybrid system also uses hydraulic fluid that is incompatible with conventional power steering fluid (which is usually automatic transmission fluid).  This fluid is still available directly from Subaru at a significant premium over more common types of hydraulic fluid.

The XT6 has two electric fans to also help performance, compared to one electric fan and one belt driven fan on all other XTs. With these changes, the XT6 was given a higher amp alternator.

The XT6 was not available with the digital instrument cluster of the turbo XT models.

In the Japanese market, the XT6 was marketed as the Alcyone VX. No front wheel drive Alcyone VXs were marketed in Japan, and virtually no XT6s were sold in New Zealand.  Subaru New Zealand did however bring in an XT6 as a demo, but as New Zealand's fuel options were 91 octane unleaded fuel or 96 octane leaded fuel, it was not a viable option to sell the XT6 as the 2700 cc 6 Cyl engine required 96 octane unleaded petrol.

The Subaru XT Turbo was the official car for the Most Valuable Player for Super Bowl XXII presented by SPORT magazine in 1988, eventually won by Washington Redskins quarterback Doug Williams, and The Subaru XT6 was the official car for the Most Valuable Player for Super Bowl XXIII in 1989, eventually won by San Francisco 49ers wide receiver Jerry Rice.

Special Editions 
A special "30th Anniversary" version of the Alcyone VX was produced in 1988, limited to 30 units. This version had a white and gold paint job with "30th Anniversary" side decals and a red interior.

2 prototype versions of the Alcyone VX were made in Japan for displaying at events. The "Junko Shimada" was one that included a full black paintjob with black smooth wheel caps and a bright red leather interior, designed by Japanese fashion designer, Junko Shimada. The other was the "FICCE Special" which was a convertible version of the Alcyone with special hubcaps and interior graphics designed by Yoshiyuki Konishi. The FICCE is allegedly sitting in the Ibaraki Prefecture in need of restoration.

Market appeal and production

Overall production of the XT remained low throughout its lifespan. Although the fuel crisis of the late 1970s and ever-tightening emissions regulations had severely limited power figures from all manufacturers in the mid 1980s, the XT's paltry  wasn't enough to attract serious attention from the automotive racing crowd. One of Subaru's ads from the 1980s read, The kind of car Mercedes might have built if they were a little more frugal and a lot more inventive. The car's extra features, which certainly had some novelty appeal, were uncharacteristic of this class of car and may not have contributed much to the XT's sales. In the 1980s, consumers with surplus cash in search of a better-equipped vehicle did not generally start shopping at Subaru.

Subaru produced 98,918 XTs, XT6s, and Alcyones. Surprisingly, only 8,170 of these were sold in the Japanese market.

While the XT was an interesting design exercise, it did little to grow Subaru's sales. The company has seen much more widespread success in the significantly more mainstream Legacy, Legacy Outback and Impreza WRX models introduced in recent years.

References

 Subaru Global history: Subaru Alcyone. Subaru's world site discusses bits and pieces of the entire model line through history.  The site does not mention the XT, but this page gives specific details on the 1985 Japanese-market Alcyone.

External links

 XT6 Haven
 SubaruXT.com: Home of the Wonder Wedge A Subaru XT/XT6 forum with a large userbase

XT
Front-wheel-drive sports cars
All-wheel-drive vehicles
Cars powered by boxer engines
Cars introduced in 1985
1980s cars
1990s cars
Cars discontinued in 1991